"Busted" is a song by Australian recording artist Joanne. It was released as the fourth single from her debut studio album, Do Not Disturb (2001), on 8 January 2001. The song peaked at  36 on the Australian ARIA Singles Chart on 25 February 2001.

Track listings
Australian CD single
 "Busted" (radio edit)  – 3:15
 "Busted" (radio extended mix)  – 5:10
 "Busted" (Miranda Rights club mix)  – 6:22
 "Busted" (The Girls Anthem mix)  – 6:11
 "Busted" (Funkalicious R&B mix)  – 3:20

Charts

References

2001 singles
2001 songs
Joanne Accom songs
Songs written by Joanne Accom